Nur ol Dini (also Romanized as Nūr ol Dīnī; also known as Nūr ed Dīnī) is a village in Kheyrgu Rural District, Alamarvdasht District, Lamerd County, Fars Province, Iran. At the 2006 census, its population was 149, in 32 families.

References 

Populated places in Lamerd County